Calcutta Hawkers' Men Union is a trade union of hawkers in Kolkata. CHMU was founded in 1971. CHMU is affiliated to All India Trade Union Congress. Its membership is mainly based amongst food vendors.

References 

Trade unions in India
All India Trade Union Congress
Trade unions in West Bengal
Retail trade unions
Organisations based in Kolkata
Street vendors
Trade unions established in 1971
1971 establishments in West Bengal